Edouard Andrew Wojtczak (29 April 1921 – 11 March 1995) was a Russian-born Polish footballer.

Career
Wojtczak worked as a tank commander in World War II. He was a member of the Second Polish Army Division, who were stationed in York and signed for York City as an amateur in October 1946. After making a typically acrobatic save, he would often bow to the crowd. He made a total of eight appearances for York.

He would star in ice shows as a skater and walked from York to London on ice skates to publicise a show. He moved to London in 1956 and edited Polish quarterly magazine Fotorama. He died at St Anthony's Hospital, North Cheam after an unsuccessful triple heart by-pass operation.

Notes

1921 births
People from Syzran
1995 deaths
Polish footballers
Association football goalkeepers
York City F.C. players